Modes of mechanical ventilation are one of the most important aspects of the usage of mechanical ventilation. The mode refers to the method of inspiratory support. In general, mode selection is based on clinician familiarity and institutional preferences, since there is a paucity of evidence indicating that the mode affects clinical outcome.  The most frequently used forms of volume-limited mechanical ventilation are intermittent mandatory ventilation (IMV) and continuous mandatory ventilation (CMV). There have been substantial changes in the nomenclature of mechanical ventilation over the years, but more recently it has become standardized by many respirology and pulmonology groups.  Writing a mode is most proper in all capital letters with a dash between the control variable and the strategy (i.e. PC-IMV, or VC-MMV etc.).

Taxonomy for mechanical ventilation 
The taxonomy is a logical classification system based on 10 maxims of ventilator design

10 maxims 

A breath is one cycle of positive flow (inspiration) and negative flow (expiration) defined in terms of the flow-time curve. Inspiratory time is defined as the period from the start of positive flow to the start of negative flow. Expiratory time is defined as the period from the start of expiratory flow to the start of inspiratory flow. The flow-time curve is the basis for many variables related to ventilator settings.
A breath is assisted if the ventilator does work on the patient. An assisted breath is one for which the ventilator does some portion of the work of breathing. For constant flow inflation, work is defined as inspiratory pressure multiplied by tidal volume. Therefore, an assisted breath is identified as a breath for which airway pressure (displayed on the ventilator) rises above baseline during inspiration. An unassisted breath is one for which the ventilator simply provides the inspiratory flow demanded by the patient and pressure stays constant throughout the breath. 
A ventilator assists breathing using either pressure control or volume control based on the equation of motion for the respiratory system. Providing assistance means doing work on the patient, which is accomplished by controlling either pressure or volume. A simple mathematical model describing this fact is known as the equation of motion for the passive respiratory system: In this equation, pressure, volume, and flow are all continuous functions of time. Pressure is actually a pressure difference across the system (e.g., transrespiratory pressure defined as pressure at the airway opening minus pressure on the body surface). Elastance (defined as the change in pressure divided by the associated change in volume; the reciprocal of compliance) and resistance (defined as a change in pressure divided by the associated change in flow) are parameters assumed to remain constant during a breath.
Breaths are classified by the criteria that trigger (start) and cycle (stop) inspiration. The start of inspiration is called the trigger event. The end of inspiration is called the cycle event.
Trigger and cycle events can be initiated by the patient or the machine. Inspiration can be patient triggered or patient cycled by a signal representing inspiratory effort. Inspiration may also be machine triggered or machine cycled by preset ventilator thresholds. 
Breaths are classified as spontaneous or mandatory based on both the trigger and cycle events. A spontaneous breath is a breath for which the patient both triggers and cycles the breath. A spontaneous breath may occur during a mandatory breath (e.g. Airway Pressure Release Ventilation). A spontaneous breath may be assisted or unassisted. A mandatory breath is a breath for which the machine triggers and/or cycles the breath. A mandatory breath can occur during a spontaneous breath (e.g., High Frequency Jet Ventilation). A mandatory breath is, by definition, assisted.
There are 3 breath sequences: Continuous mandatory ventilation (CMV), Intermittent Mandatory Ventilation (IMV), and Continuous Spontaneous Ventilation (CSV). A breath sequence is a particular pattern of spontaneous and/or mandatory breaths. The 3 possible breath sequences are: continuous mandatory ventilation, (CMV, spontaneous breaths are not allowed between mandatory breaths), intermittent mandatory ventilation (IMV, spontaneous breaths may occur between mandatory breaths), and continuous spontaneous ventilation (CSV, all breaths are spontaneous).
There are 5 basic ventilatory patterns: VC-CMV, VC-IMV, PC-CMV, PC-IMV, and PC-CSV. The combination VC-CSV is not possible because volume control implies machine cycling and machine cycling makes every breath mandatory, not spontaneous. A sixth pattern, TC-IMV is possible but rare.  
Within each ventilatory pattern there are several variations that can be distinguished by their targeting scheme(s). A targeting scheme is a description of how the ventilator achieves preset targets. A target is a predetermined goal of ventilator output. Examples of within-breath targets include inspiratory flow or pressure and rise time (set-point targeting), tidal volume (dual targeting) and constant of proportionality between inspiratory pressure and patient effort (servo targeting). Examples of between-breath targets and targeting schemes include average tidal volume (for adaptive targeting), percent minute ventilation (for optimal targeting) and combined PCO2, volume, and frequency values describing a "zone of comfort" (for intelligent targeting, e.g., SmartCarePS or IntelliVent-ASV). The targeting scheme (or combination of targeting schemes) is what distinguishes one ventilatory pattern from another. There are 7 basic targeting schemes that comprise the wide variety seen in different modes of ventilation: 
A mode of ventilation is classified according to its control variable, breath sequence, and targeting scheme(s). The preceding 9 maxims create a theoretical foundation for a taxonomy of mechanical ventilation. The taxonomy is based on these theoretical constructs and has 4 hierarchical levels:
Control Variable (Pressure or Volume, for the primary breath)
Breath Sequence (CMV, IMV, or CSV)
Primary Breath Targeting Scheme (for CMV or CSV)
Secondary Breath Targeting Scheme (for IMV)

How modes are classified 
Step 1: Identify the primary breath control variable. If inspiration starts with a preset inspiratory pressure, or if pressure is proportional to inspiratory effort, then the control variable is pressure. If inspiration starts with a preset tidal volume and inspiratory flow, then the control variable is volume. If neither is true, the control variable is time.

Step 2: Identify the breath sequence. Determine whether trigger and cycle events are patient or machine determined. Then, use this information to determine the breath sequence.

Step 3: Identify the targeting schemes for the primary breaths and (if applicable) secondary breaths.

Example mode classification is given below 
Mode Name: A/C Volume Control (Covidien PB 840): 
Inspiratory volume and flow are preset, so the control variable is volume.
Every breath is volume cycled, which is a form of machine cycling. Any breath for which inspiration is machine cycled is classified as a mandatory breath. Hence, the breath sequence is continuous mandatory ventilation. 
The operator sets all the parameters of the volume and flow waveforms so the targeting scheme is set-point. Thus, the mode is classified as volume control continuous mandatory ventilation with set-point targeting (VC-CMVs).
Mode Name: SIMV Volume Control Plus (Covidien PB 840): 
The operator sets the tidal volume but not the inspiratory flow. Because setting volume alone (like setting flow alone) is a necessary but not sufficient criterion for volume control, the control variable is pressure. 
Spontaneous breaths are allowed between mandatory breaths so the breath sequence is IMV. 
The ventilator adjusts inspiratory pressure between breaths to achieve an average preset tidal volume, so the targeting scheme is adaptive. The mode tag is PC-IMVa,s.

Descriptions of common modes 

Mechanical ventilation machines are available with both invasive modes (such as intubation) and non-invasive modes (such as BPAP).  Invasive has to do with the insertion of medical devices or tubes internal to the patient, while non-invasive is completely external to the patient, as for example in using a tightly fitting mask or other device that covers the patient's nose and mouth.

Assist mode, control mode, and assist-control mode 
A basic distinction in mechanical ventilation is whether each breath is initiated by the patient (assist mode) or by the machine (control mode). Dynamic hybrids of the two (assist-control modes) are also possible, and control mode without assist is now mostly obsolete.

Airway pressure release ventilation 

Airway pressure release ventilation is a time-cycled alternant between two levels of positive airway pressure, with the main time on the high level and a brief expiratory release to facilitate ventilation.

Airway pressure release ventilation is usually utilized as a type of inverse ratio ventilation.  The exhalation time (Tlow) is shortened to usually less than one second to maintain alveoli inflation.  In the basic sense, this is a continuous pressure with a brief release.  APRV currently the most efficient conventional mode for lung protective ventilation.

Different perceptions of this mode may exist around the globe. While 'APRV' is common to users in North America, a very similar mode, biphasic positive airway pressure (BIPAP), was introduced in Europe.  The term APRV has also been used in American journals where, from the ventilation characteristics, BIPAP would have been perfectly good terminology. But BiPAP(tm) is a trademark for a noninvasive ventilation mode in a specific ventilator (Respironics Inc.).

Other manufacturers have followed with their own brand names (BILEVEL, DUOPAP, BIVENT). Although similar in modality, these terms describe how a mode is intended to inflate the lung, rather than defining the characteristics of synchronization or the way spontaneous breathing efforts are supported.

Intermittent mandatory ventilation has not always had the synchronized feature, so the division of modes were understood to be SIMV (synchronized) vs IMV (not-synchronized). Since the American Association for Respiratory Care established a nomenclature of mechanical ventilation the "synchronized" part of the title has been dropped and now there is only IMV.

Mandatory minute ventilation 
Mandatory minute ventilation (MMV) allows spontaneous breathing with automatic adjustments of mandatory ventilation to the meet the patient's preset minimum minute volume requirement. If the patient maintains the minute volume settings for VT x f, no mandatory breaths are delivered.

If the patient's minute volume is insufficient, mandatory delivery of the preset tidal volume will occur until the minute volume is achieved.  The method for monitoring whether or not the patient is meeting the required minute ventilation (VE) differs by ventilator brand and model, but, in general, there is a window of monitored time, and a smaller window checked against the larger window (i.e., in the Dräger Evita® line of mechanical ventilators there is a moving 20-second window, and every 7 seconds the current tidal volume and rate are measured) to decide whether a mechanical breath is needed to maintain the minute ventilation.

MMV is an optimal mode for weaning in neonatal and pediatric populations and has been shown to reduce long-term complications related to mechanical ventilation.

Pressure-regulated volume control 
Pressure-regulated volume control is an IMV based mode.  Pressure-regulated volume control utilizes pressure-limited, volume-targeted, time-cycled breaths that can be either ventilator- or patient-initiated.

The peak inspiratory pressure delivered by the ventilator is varied on a breath-to-breath basis to achieve a target tidal volume that is set by the clinician.

For example, if a target tidal volume of 500 mL is set but the ventilator delivers 600 mL, the next breath will be delivered with a lower inspiratory pressure to achieve a lower tidal volume.  Though PRVC is regarded as a hybrid mode because of its tidal-volume (VC) settings and pressure-limiting (PC) settings fundamentally PRVC is a pressure-control mode with adaptive targeting.

Continuous positive airway pressure
Continuous positive airway pressure (CPAP) is a non-invasive positive pressure mode of respiratory support. CPAP is a pressure applied at the end of exhalation to keep the alveoli open and not fully deflate.  This mechanism for maintaining inflated alveoli helps increase partial pressure of oxygen in arterial blood, an appropriate increase in CPAP increases the PaO2.

Automatic positive airway pressure
Automatic positive airway pressure (APAP) is a form of CPAP that automatically tunes the amount of pressure delivered to the patient to the minimum required to maintain an unobstructed airway on a breath-by-breath basis by measuring the resistance in the patient's breathing.

Bilevel positive airway pressure 
Bilevel positive airway pressure (BPAP) is a mode used during non-invasive ventilation (NIV).  First used in 1988 by Professor Benzer in Austria, it delivers a preset inspiratory positive airway pressure (IPAP) and expiratory positive airway pressure (EPAP).  BPAP can be described as a Continuous Positive Airway Pressure system with a time-cycle change of the applied CPAP level.

CPAP/APAP, BPAP, and other non-invasive ventilation modes have been shown to be effective management tools for chronic obstructive pulmonary disease, acute respiratory failure, sleep apnea, etc.

Often BPAP is incorrectly referred to as "BiPAP". BiPAP is the name of a portable ventilator manufactured by Respironics Corporation; it is just one of many ventilators that can deliver BPAP.

Medical uses
BPAP has been shown to be useful in reducing mortality and reducing the need for endotracheal intubation when used in people with chronic obstructive pulmonary disease (COPD).

High-frequency ventilation (Active) 
The term active refers to the ventilator's forced expiratory system.  In a HFV-A scenario, the ventilator uses pressure to apply an inspiratory breath and then applies an opposite pressure to force an expiratory breath.  In high-frequency oscillatory ventilation (sometimes abbreviated HFOV) the oscillation bellows and piston force positive pressure in and apply negative pressure to force an expiration.

High-frequency ventilation (Passive) 
The term passive refers to the ventilator's non-forced expiratory system.  In a HFV-P scenario, the ventilator uses pressure to apply an inspiratory breath and then returns to atmospheric pressure to allow for a passive expiration.  This is seen in High-Frequency Jet Ventilation, sometimes abbreviated HFJV. Also categorized under High Frequency Ventilation  is High Frequency Percussive Ventilation, sometimes abbreviated HFPV. With HFPV it utilizes an open circuit to deliver its subtidal volumes by way of the patient interface known as the Phasitron.

Volume guarantee 
Volume guarantee an additional parameter available in many types of ventilators that allows the ventilator to change its inspiratory pressure setting to achieve a minimum tidal volume.  This is utilized most often in neonatal patients who need a pressure controlled mode with a consideration for volume control to minimize volutrauma.

Spontaneous breathing and support settings

Positive end-expiratory pressure 
Positive end expiratory pressure (PEEP) is pressure applied upon expiration.  PEEP is applied using either a valve that is connected to the expiratory port and set manually or a valve managed internally by a mechanical ventilator.

PEEP is a pressure that an exhalation has to bypass, in effect causing alveoli to remain open and not fully deflate.  This mechanism for maintaining inflated alveoli helps increase partial pressure of oxygen in arterial blood, and an increase in PEEP increases the PaO2.

Pressure support 
Pressure support is a spontaneous mode of ventilation also named Pressure Support Ventilation (PSV). The patient initiates every breath and the ventilator delivers support with the preset pressure value. With support from the ventilator, the patient also regulates their own respiratory rate and their tidal volume.

In Pressure Support, the set inspiratory pressure support level is kept constant and there is a decelerating flow. The patient triggers all breaths. If there is a change in the mechanical properties of the lung/thorax and patient effort, the delivered tidal volume will be affected. The user must then regulate the pressure support level to obtain desired ventilation.

Pressure support improves oxygenation, ventilation and decreases work of breathing.

Also see adaptive support ventilation.

Other ventilation modes and strategies

Negative pressure ventilation
Main article: Negative pressure ventilator
Negative-pressure ventilation stimulates (or forces) breathing by periodic application of partial vacuum (air pressure reduced below ambient pressure), applied externally to the patient's torso—specifically, chest and abdomen—to assist (or force) the chest to expand, expanding the lungs, resulting in voluntary (or involuntary)  inhalation through the patient's airway.

Various "negative pressure ventilators" (NPVs) have been developed to serve this function—most famously the "Iron lung," a tank in which the patient lays, with only their head exposed to ambient air, while air pressure on the remainder of their body, inside the tank, is varied by pumping, to stimulate chest and lung expansion and contraction. Though not in wide use today, NPVs were the principal forms of hospital and long-term mechanical ventilation in the first half of the 20th century, and remain in limited use today.

Closed loop systems

Adaptive Support Ventilation
Adaptive Support Ventilation (ASV) is the only commercially available mode that uses optimal targeting. This ventilation mode was invented and subsequently patented in 1991 by Tehrani In this positive pressure mode of ventilation, the frequency and tidal volume of breaths of a patient on the ventilator are automatically adjusted and optimized to mimic natural breathing, stimulate spontaneous breathing, and reduce weaning time. In the ASV mode, every breath is synchronized with patient effort if such an effort exists, and otherwise, full mechanical ventilation is provided to the patient.

Automatic Tube Compensation
Automatic Tube Compensation (ATC) is the simplest example of a computer-controlled targeting system on a ventilator. It is a form of servo targeting.

The goal of ATC is to support the resistive work of breathing through the artificial airway

Neurally Adjusted Ventilatory Assist
Neurally Adjusted Ventilatory Assist (NAVA) is adjusted by a computer (servo) and is similar to ATC but with more complex requirements for implementation.

In terms of patient-ventilator synchrony, NAVA supports both resistive and elastic work of breathing in proportion to the patient's inspiratory effort

Proportional Assist Ventilation
Proportional assist ventilation (PAV) is another servo targeting based mode in which the ventilator guarantees the percentage of work regardless of changes in pulmonary compliance and resistance.

The ventilator varies the tidal volume and pressure based on the patient's work of breathing.  The amount it delivers is proportional to the percentage of assistance it is set to give.

PAV, like NAVA, supports both restrictive and elastic work of breathing in proportion to the patient's inspiratory effort.

Liquid ventilation 
Liquid ventilation is a technique of mechanical ventilation in which the lungs are insufflated with an oxygenated perfluorochemical liquid rather than an oxygen-containing gas mixture. The use of perfluorochemicals, rather than nitrogen, as the inert carrier of oxygen and carbon dioxide offers a number of theoretical advantages for the treatment of acute lung injury, including:
Reducing surface tension by maintaining a fluid interface with alveoli
Opening of collapsed alveoli by hydraulic pressure with a lower risk of barotrauma
Providing a reservoir in which oxygen and carbon dioxide can be exchanged with pulmonary capillary blood
Functioning as a high-efficiency heat exchanger
Despite its theoretical advantages, efficacy studies have been disappointing and the optimal clinical use of LV has yet to be defined.

Total liquid ventilation 
In total liquid ventilation (TLV), the entire lung is filled with an oxygenated PFC liquid, and a liquid tidal volume of PFC is actively pumped into and out of the lungs. A specialized apparatus is required to deliver and remove the relatively dense, viscous PFC tidal volumes, and to extracorporeally oxygenate and remove carbon dioxide from the liquid.

Partial liquid ventilation 
In partial liquid ventilation (PLV), the lungs are slowly filled with a volume of PFC equivalent or close to the FRC during gas ventilation. The PFC within the lungs is oxygenated and carbon dioxide is removed by means of gas breaths cycling in the lungs by a conventional gas ventilator.

See also

 
 
Prone ventilation

References

Respiratory therapy
Intensive care medicine
Mechanical ventilation
Pulmonology